is a Japanese light novel isekai series written by Okina Baba and illustrated by Tsukasa Kiryu. The story follows a class that is killed in a mysterious explosion and reincarnated into another world with one girl reincarnated as a dungeon spider. The spider evolves and ends up having a significant influence on the world, becoming one of its most powerful creatures, while the students and their teacher deal with the fallout from her actions and those of other armies. The series has received a manga adaptation, and an anime television series adaptation produced by Millepensee aired from January to July 2021.

Plot

In a world where the battle between Hero and Demon Lord repeated itself time and time again, an enormous space-time spell misfired and hit a certain Japanese high school class on Earth, killing everyone in it. However, guided by what seemed to be a miracle, the students were all reincarnated into that other world. While a handful was fortunate enough to become royalty, nobles, and other kinds of influential people, one girl was not so lucky. Being reborn as a spider monster of the weakest kind in a dungeon filled with vicious beasts, she is forced to experience extreme hardship. Even so, armed with nothing but her human knowledge and overwhelming positivity, she continues to press on and survive against creatures much stronger than herself.

Media

Light novels
Okina Baba originally serialized the series as a web novel on the user-generated content site Shōsetsuka ni Narō starting on May 27, 2015. Fujimi Shobo acquired the series for print publication, and published the first light novel, with illustrations by Tsukasa Kiryu, in December 2015.  Yen Press announced during their panel at Sakura-Con on April 15, 2017, that they had licensed the series. The series' main story ended with its 16th volume released on January 8, 2022.

Manga
Asahiro Kakashi launched a manga adaptation of the web novels on the Kadokawa Shoten's Young Ace Up manga website on December 22, 2015. The manga is also licensed by Yen Press.

Anime
It was reported on July 6, 2018, that the series would receive an anime adaptation, according to an early look at the wraparound jacket band on the fifth volume of the manga adaptation. The report was confirmed at Kadokawa's booth at Anime Expo later that day, and it was announced that the adaptation would be a television series. Originally set to premiere in 2020, it was rescheduled to premiere in January 2021 due to the COVID-19 pandemic. The two-cour (24 episode) series was animated by Millepensee and directed by Shin Itagaki, with Okina Baba and Yūichirō Momose overseeing the series' scripts, and Kii Tanaka designing the characters, Shūji Katayama composing the series' music, and Jōtarō Ishigami producing the series. The series aired from January 8 to July 3, 2021, on AT-X and other channels. The first opening theme song is "keep weaving your spider way" performed by Riko Azuna, while the first ending theme song is  performed by I (Aoi Yūki). It is licensed by Crunchyroll outside Asia. Medialink has licensed the series in Southeast Asia and South Asia, and is streaming it on their Ani-One YouTube channel and Bilibili. The final episode was delayed due to production issues and aired one week later on July 3, 2021.

Reception
The light novels and manga had a combined 1.2 million copies in print as of July 2018. The light novels ranked third in the tankōbon category in the Kono Light Novel ga Sugoi! 2017 rankings, and second in the 2018 rankings.

See also
 Cultural depictions of spiders

Notes

References

External links
  
  
  
  
 

2015 Japanese novels
2021 anime television series debuts
Anime and manga based on light novels
Anime postponed due to the COVID-19 pandemic
AT-X (TV network) original programming
Crunchyroll Originals
Fiction about reincarnation
Fujimi Shobo
Isekai anime and manga
Isekai novels and light novels
Kadokawa Dwango franchises
Kadokawa Shoten manga
Light novels
Light novels first published online
Medialink
Seinen manga
Shōsetsuka ni Narō
Spiders in popular culture
Yen Press titles